Mount Somers / Te Kiekie is a mountain in the South Island of New Zealand, located in the foothills of the Southern Alps. At , it is prominently visible from the Canterbury Plains. The area around the mountain offers opportunities for day walks and overnight tramping.

Etymology
The mountain's Māori name, Te Kiekie, refers to a chief who arrived on the Āraiteuru canoe. The European name was given by the surveyor of the Canterbury Association, Captain Joseph Thomas, and recorded on his 1849 map of Canterbury. Like most names assigned by Thomas, it commemorates a member of the Canterbury Association, in this case the banker and MP Thomas Somers-Cocks (1815–1899).

The mountain's European name was later used for a settlement, Mount Somers, and then a branch line railway, the Mount Somers Branch.

History
Māori traversed the area both to access the timber and wildlife of Alford Forest and to exploit their discovery of a hard greenish stone (Surrey Hills Tuff porcelainite) for making knives and adzes. The mountain's high country portion was farmed until the 1970s after being settled as a sheep station in 1856 by the lawyer pair Charles Tripp and John Acland, who had got the idea of farming in the new colony from acquaintances interested in the Canterbury Association. However, by the time they had accumulated experience in farming, only high country tussock land—unattractive to others—was available at a price they could afford. The business partnership that lasted to 1862 made both men rich in short order and when the partnership ended Charles Tripp, by now the brother in law of John Acland, became sole owner of the Mount Somers land.

Geology and botany

Most of the hills in the Mid Canterbury area are made up of greywacke. Mount Somers / Te Kiekie is of volcanic origin, though, as an overlay of the Torlesse Composite Terrane. There are areas of andesite, rhyolite, basalt and ignimbrite that erupted 89 million years ago that form part of the Mount Somers Volcanic Group that extends to the Banks Peninsula.

There are fault lines visible, columns, and cooling fractures. Especially to the east of the mountain, there are viable deposits of silica, sand, limestone, and coal.

Soils have poor fertility. Some areas form plateaus and combined with high rainfall, the area is ideal for plants that prefer boggy conditions. Up to   there are stands of native forest, known as the Alford Forest. This has a smaller stand in the Woolshed Creek valley (known as 'Ancient Forest'), and a larger stand on the south and east flanks of Mount Somers and the adjacent Mount Winterslow.

Tramping in the area
The area's coal deposits were first discovered in 1856, which let to the founding of the village Mount Somers. A tramline was built to get the coal to the village. Mining for coal stopped in 1954. The route of the tramline is now part of the tramping track called Miners Track that goes from the Woolshed Creek car park to Woolshed Creek Hut. The walk to Woolshed Creek Hut via Miners Track is one of the best known tramps in Mid Canterbury. A more challenging route to Woolshed Creek Hut is via the Rhyolite Ridge Track past an overhang which is named the Bus Stop.

The Mt Somers Walkways Society formed in 1983, made up by locals from Mount Somers and Staveley. Their aim was to create a circular track around the mountain and the Mt Somers Track was officially opened in 1987. In the late 2000s, a tramping shelter was added to the southern part of the track and this saw the official completion of the project. That tramping shelter is named Acland shelter, is located above Mount Somers Station, and is named for the original European owner of the land – John Acland. Mount Somers / Te Kiekie itself can be reached via the southern part of the Mt Somers Track. It can be reached starting from either the Woolshed Creek car park, or the Sharplin Fall car park. The Mt Somers Summit Track is the side track to the summit; as it is located on the south face of the mountain, it gets very icy in winter and is then difficult to climb.

Mt Somers Track starts and finishes at Sharplin Falls car park. The northern part of the circuit follows Bowyers Stream for a while. A once popular destination, Sharplin Falls (on Bowyers Stream), closed in February 2015 after rockfall took out that part of the track that was built as a gantry on a rock face. Two years later, the Department of Conservation announced that the closure of the side track to Sharplin Falls would be permanent. Mt Somers Track, after following Bowyers Stream for some distance, reaches Pinnacles Hut. The hut was named for the rock formation behind it on the north face of Mount Somers / Te Kiekie. The track then climbs over Mount Somers saddle before it descends to Woolshed Creek Hut. From the hut, the track ascends to the overhand known as the Bus Stop. It then continues via the Acland Shelter along the south face of Mount Somers / Te Kiekie and climbs up onto Staveley Hill, the point where the Mt Somers Summit Track starts. From Staveley Hill, the track descends towards the Sharplin Falls car park.

Footnotes

References

External links
The Somers ignimbrite and related volcanics, Mt Somers, mid-Canterbury, New Zealand (1994); PhD thesis

Somers Te Kiekie
Somers Te Kiekie
Ashburton District
Volcanoes of Canterbury, New Zealand